The Ungku Tun Aminah Mosque is a mosque in Tampoi, Johor Bahru, Johor, Malaysia. The mosque is similar to National Mosque in Kuala Lumpur.

See also
 Islam in Malaysia

References

Buildings and structures in Johor Bahru
Mosques in Johor